The 2013–14 FC Twente season was the club's 30th in the Eredivisie since their promotion in 1984. They participated in the league, finishing third, and the KNVB Cup, where they were eliminated by Heerenveen in the second round. It was Michel Jansen's only full season as manager while Alfred Schreuder earned his coaching badges.

Squad

 (on loan from Zenit Saint Petersburg)

On loan

Transfers

Summer

In:

Out:

Winter

In:

Out:

Competitions

Eredivisie

Results summary

Results by round

Results

League table

KNVB Cup

Squad statistics

Appearances and goals

|-
|colspan="14"|Players away from the club on loan:

|-
|colspan="14"|Players who appeared for Twente that left during the season:

|}

Goal scorers

Disciplinary record

References

FC Twente seasons
Twente